Daniel Jae Hong Im (born April 5, 1985) is an American professional golfer.

Im was born in Wayne, New Jersey. He played college golf at UCLA where he won the Pac-10 Conference championship in 2006.

Im played on the Canadian Tour in 2008, winning two events, finishing third on the Order of Merit, and was named the International Rookie of the Year. In 2009, he finished 25th on the Order of Merit.

Im played on the Challenge Tour in 2013, making 17 cuts in 23 events and finishing 17th on the tour rankings. His best finish was tied for second at the Norwegian Challenge. He played primarily on the European Tour in 2014, making 15 cuts in 21 events. His best finish was tied for seventh at the Lyoness Open. He returned to the Challenge Tour in 2015 and won the Swiss Challenge in June.

Professional wins (3)

Challenge Tour wins (1)

Challenge Tour playoff record (1–0)

Canadian Tour wins (2)

See also
2015 European Tour Qualifying School graduates

References

External links

American male golfers
UCLA Bruins men's golfers
European Tour golfers
Golfers from New Jersey
Golfers from California
American sportspeople of Korean descent
People from Wayne, New Jersey
People from La Mirada, California
Sportspeople from Passaic County, New Jersey
1985 births
Living people